Mr. Gone is the eighth studio album by jazz fusion band Weather Report released in 1978 by ARC/Columbia Records. The album rose to No. 1 on the Billboard Jazz Albums chart.

Overview 

As the group was still looking for a drummer following the departure of Alex Acuña, outside drummers Tony Williams and Steve Gadd appear along with Peter Erskine, who would become Acuña's replacement. Singers Deniece Williams and Maurice White also appear on the track "And Then." The Pastorius-penned "Punk Jazz" was later the title of a posthumous compilation of Jaco Pastorius's music.

The record became a center of controversy when DownBeat magazine gave it a one-star review. Zawinul went on to deliver a furious response to this review during a later interview.

According to Wayne Shorter, Joe Zawinul came up with the name "Mr. Gone" as a reference to Shorter who was absent while the band was working on that album. Shorter stated in an interview on the Questlove Supreme podcast, "I stayed another month in Brazil while they were making a record.  They were making some music and they named it after me.  Joe Zawinul said, 'Let's call this one, Mr. Gone.'

Critical reception

Mr. Gone came in at No. 1 on High Fidelity'''s 1978 Critics' Choice poll in the category of Best Contemporary Jazz Album. Music critic Jon Pareles also placed Mr. Gone in his ballot for the Village Voice'' 1978 Pazz and Jop poll.

Track listing
"The Pursuit of the Woman with the Feathered Hat" (Zawinul) 5:03
"River People" (Pastorius) 4:50
"Young and Fine" (Zawinul) 6:55
"The Elders" (Shorter, arranged by Zawinul) 4:21
"Mr. Gone" (Zawinul) 5:26
"Punk Jazz" (Pastorius) 5:09
"Pinocchio" (Shorter) 2:26
"And Then" (music - Zawinul, lyrics - Sam Guest) 3:22

Personnel 

The recording and technical personnel were as follows:

Weather Report

 Joe Zawinul - modified Rhodes 88 electric piano, acoustic piano, two ARP 2600 synthesizers, Oberheim Polyphonic synthesizer, Sequential Circuits Prophet-5 synthesizer, Mu-Tron Bi-Phase and Mu-Tron Volume Wah effects, kalimba, thumbeki drums, sleigh bells, melodica, high hat, vocals (tracks 1 and 5)
 Wayne Shorter - tenor, alto, and soprano saxophones, vocals (track 1)
 Jaco Pastorius - bass, drums (tracks 1 and 2), timpani (track 2), vocals (tracks 1, 2, and 6)
 Peter Erskine - drums (tracks 1 and 7), hi hat (track 3), vocals (track 1)

Additional musicians

 Tony Williams - drums (tracks 5 and 6)
 Steve Gadd - drums (tracks 3 and 8)
 Manolo Badrena - vocal solo (track 1)
 Jon Lucien - vocals (track 1)
 Deniece Williams - vocals (track 8)
 Maurice White - vocals (track 8)

Technical

 Alex Kazanegras - engineer
 Dave Mancini - second engineer
 Nancy Donald - cover design
 Lou Beach - cover illustration

Chart positions

References

1978 albums
Columbia Records albums
ARC Records albums
Weather Report albums